Pressman is a surname and may refer to:
Barney Pressman (1894–1991), American businessman
David Pressman (born 1977), American attorney and diplomat
Edward R. Pressman (born 1943), American film producer
Fred Pressman (1923–1996), American businessman
Gabe Pressman (1924–2017), American television reporter
Jacob Pressman (1919–2015), American conservative rabbi from Los Angeles, California
Jessica Pressman, American literary scholar
Kevin Pressman (born 1967), English professional football player
Lawrence Pressman (born 1939), American actor
Lee Pressman (1906–1969), American New Deal government official and self-confessed communist
Lynn Pressman Raymond (c. 1912–2009), American business executive
Roger S. Pressman (contemporary), American technology writer
Sally Pressman (born 1981), American ballet dancer and actress
Steven Pressman (born 1955), American legal journalist
Steven Pressman (economist) (born 1952), American economist
Thelma Pressman (1921–2011), American microwave cooking consultant and cookbook author
Yassi Pressman (born 1995), Filipina-British model, actress, TV personality, singer and dancer

Fictional characters
Milo Pressman, character on the television series 24